Kirkhill is a rural community in Cumberland County, Nova Scotia, northwest of Parrsboro on Route 209.  It is reputed that the town's name derives from settler James Kirkpatrick, who settled on "Kirk's Hill" in 1812.  A road equipment garage of the Nova Scotia Department of Transportation is located in Kirkhill.

References

Communities in Cumberland County, Nova Scotia